Chenderiang is a state constituency in Perak, Malaysia, that has been represented in the Perak State Legislative Assembly.

Demographics

History

Polling districts
According to the federal gazette issued on 31 October 2022, the Chenderiang constituency is divided into 17 polling districts.

Representation history

Election results

References

Perak state constituencies